Dwayne Hendricks (born March 17, 1986) is a former American football defensive tackle. He was signed by the New York Giants as an undrafted free agent in 2010. He played college football for the University of Miami. Hendricks was on the roster of the Arizona Rattlers during their ArenaBowl XXVI championship.

References

External links
New York Giants bio

1986 births
Living people
Players of American football from New Jersey
American football defensive tackles
Miami Hurricanes football players
New York Giants players
Arizona Rattlers players
People from Millville, New Jersey
Millville Senior High School alumni
Sportspeople from Cumberland County, New Jersey